Podborne may refer to the following places in Poland:

Kowalewo Podborne
Kraszewo Podborne
Toczyski Podborne